The World Series Cricket Cavaliers XI was a cricket team formed to play in World Series Cricket. Taking the International Cavaliers as its inspiration, the team was envisaged as a way of giving those players under contract to the WSC organisation, but not picked regularly for one of the three main teams (Australia XI, the West Indies XI and the Rest Of The World XI) regular match play and opportunities to win prize money. The team was formed in 1978, before the start of the second season of World Series Cricket, with a tour of Australia scheduled to take place at the same time as the main competition. This would see the Cavaliers play each of the other three WSC teams at a range of smaller venues around Australia between November 1978 and February 1979.

Cavaliers Country Tour 1978/79
Following the end of the 1977/78 World Series Cricket season, Kerry Packer's organisation signed up a second tranche of players to participate in the series. The consequence of this was that there were invariably more players available than there were places in the three WSC teams. To compensate for those players who were not being selected regularly, a new side was formed in 1978 that would undertake a tour of Australia. The plan was for this new side, which came to be called the "Cavaliers", to take on each of the other three WSC teams in turn in a series of both one-day and two-day games. The schedule would see whichever of the three teams was not playing either a Supertest or an International Cup game taking on the Cavaliers. This ensured not only that the "fringe" players got both match practice and access to prize money on offer by playing for the Cavaliers, but also that the other teams were also able to continue playing during "downtime" periods when they were not in the main WSC schedule. It had the further effect of bringing World Series Cricket to a number of smaller venues around the country, rather than restricting it to playing in the major cities.

The Cavaliers Country Tour eventually encompassed a total of 9 two-day games and 15 one-day games. These were scheduled in four separate blocks. The first three games were all one-day, with each scheduled against one of the other WSC teams and played in Western Australia. This was followed by a two-week tour of Queensland against the West Indies, then another two-week tour of Victoria and New South Wales (NSW) against Australia, with a final three-week stint against the World XI, again in Victoria and NSW. The final game saw the Cavaliers take on the West Indies in a two-day game in Tasmania.

Cavaliers overall record

Cavaliers v Australia

WSC Cavaliers XI v WSC West Indies XI

WSC Cavaliers XI v WSC Rest Of The World XI

See also
World Series Cricket results
World Series Cricket player records
WSC Australia XI
WSC West Indies XI
WSC Rest Of The World XI

External links
Cavaliers Country Tour 1978/79 - ESPN Cricinfo

Cavaliers XI